Leo Kruger may refer to:

 Leo Kruger (rugby union), South African rugby union player
 Leo Kruger, South African wrestler also known as Adam Rose